

Key
Players are listed according to the date of their first-team debut for the club.

Playing positions

Players

Men

Prior to the 1949–50 season

Players whose name is in italics have played for the club after to the 1948–49 season.

Since the 1949–50 season

Verbandsliga Westfalen promotion playoffs, regional cups (e.g. DFB-Pokal qualification rounds) and Intertoto Cup matches not included, therefore the overall statistics are incomplete.
Players whose name is in italics may have played for the club prior to the 1949–50 season, therefore their total league statistics may be incomplete.
Players whose name is in bold currently play for the club.

Women

References

VfL Bochum
Bochum
Association football player non-biographical articles